Coleroidion is a genus of beetles in the family Cerambycidae, containing the following species:

 Coleroidion cingulum Martins, 1969
 Coleroidion leucotrichum (Martins, 1960)

References

Ibidionini